The 1892 Democratic National Convention was held in Chicago, Illinois, June 21–June 23, and nominated former President Grover Cleveland, who had been the party's standard-bearer in 1884 and 1888. This marked the last time a former president was renominated by a major party. Adlai E. Stevenson of Illinois was nominated for vice president. The ticket was victorious in the general election, defeating the Republican nominees, President Benjamin Harrison and his running mate, Whitelaw Reid.

The Convention

Presidential Candidates 

By the end of Harrison's term, many Americans were ready to return to Cleveland's hard money policy on the currency question. As Democrats convened in Chicago, Illinois from June 8–June 11, 1892, Cleveland was the frontrunner, but faced formidable opposition. He had come out against the free coinage of silver, thereby earning the enmity of Western and Southern Democrats. Most damaging of all was the opposition of his home state; the New York delegation, packed with Tammany men, frequently demonstrated their hostility to Cleveland's candidacy on the convention floor. However, Cleveland's cause was aided by his position on the tariff, his perceived electability, a strong organization, and the weakness of his rivals' candidacies.

Three names were placed in nomination: Grover Cleveland, David B. Hill, and Horace Boies. With 910 votes apportioned among the delegates, the Democratic Party's two-thirds rule required 601 votes to obtain the nomination. Cleveland received 617.33, to 114 for Senator Hill of New York, the candidate of Tammany Hall, 103 for Governor Boies of Iowa, a populist and former Republican, and the rest scattered. Once Cleveland's victory became clear, delegates moved to make the nomination unanimous, and on the revised first ballot Cleveland obtained all 910 votes.

Source: US President - D Convention. Our Campaigns. (September 7, 2009).

Vice Presidential Candidates 

Allen G. Thurman, Cleveland's running mate in 1888, supported Cleveland for president in 1892, but was not a candidate for vice president.

Four names were placed in nomination: Isaac P. Gray, Adlai E. Stevenson, Allen B. Morse, and John L. Mitchell. Cleveland forces preferred Gray of Indiana for vice president, but Gray faced opposition due to his past as a Republican. Stevenson of Illinois finished ahead of Gray on the first ballot. Revised first ballot totals gave Stevenson enough votes to obtain the nomination, after which delegates made the selection unanimous. As a supporter of using greenbacks and free silver to inflate the currency and alleviate economic distress in rural districts, Stevenson balanced the ticket headed by Cleveland, a hard-money, gold-standard supporter.

Source: US Vice President - D Convention. Our Campaigns. (September 7, 2009).

Platform
The 1892 convention adopted a platform:
 endorsing "a return to [Jeffersonian and Madisonian] fundamental principles of free popular government, based on home rule and individual liberty"
 opposing "Federal control of elections, to which the Republican party has committed itself"
 opposing "the Republican policy of profligate expenditure"
 denouncing "Republican protection as fraud" and declaring it "a fundamental principle of the Democratic party that the Federal Government has no constitutional power to impose and collect tariff duties, except for the purpose of revenue only"
 denouncing the McKinley Tariff as "the culminating atrocity of class legislation" and endorsing ongoing efforts to modify or repeal it
 denouncing the tariff's effect on agricultural surplus and mortgage rates in the West
 denouncing "the sham reciprocity" which "pretend[s] to establish closer trade relations for a country whose articles of export are almost exclusively agricultural products with other countries that are also agricultural, while erecting a custom=house barrier of prohibitive tariff taxes against the richest countries of the world that stand ready to take our entire surplus of products, and to exchange therefor commodities which are necessaries and comforts of life among our own people"
 demanding enforcement of the laws made to prevent and control "the Trusts and Combinations, which are designed to enable capital to secure more than its just share of the joint product of Capital and Labor, a natural consequence of the prohibitive taxes" and further legislation "in restraint of their abuses as experience may show to be necessary"
 reaffirming the 1876 declaration in favor of "reform of the civil service" and denouncing the recent Republican convention as "a scandalous satire upon free popular institutions and a startling illustration of the methods by which a President may gratify his ambition" in which Benjamin Harrison was re-nominated "by delegations composed largely of his appointees, holding office at his pleasure"
 pledging to continue the policy of reclaiming public lands "to be sacredly held as homesteads for our citizens"
 denouncing the Sherman Silver Purchase Act as "a cowardly makeshift" and holding in favor of:
 "the use of both gold and silver as the standard money of the country"
 "the coinage of both gold and silver without discriminating against either metal or charge for mintage, but the dollar unit of coinage of both metals must be of equal intrinsic and exchangeable value, or be adjusted through international agreement or by such safeguards of legislation as shall insure the maintenance of the parity of the two metals and the equal power of every dollar at all times in the markets and in the payment of debts" 
 "that all paper currency shall be kept at par with and redeemable in such coin"
 any monetary policy necessary to protect farmers and laborers, "the first and most defenseless victims of unstable money and fluctuating currency"
 recommending the repeal of the 10% tax on state banknotes
 recognizing "the World's Columbian Exposition as a national undertaking of vast importance and calling on Congress to "make such necessary financial provision as shall be requisite to the maintenance of the national honor and public faith"
 condemning the "oppression practised by the Russian Government upon its Lutheran and Jewish subjects" and demanding the President act "to bring about a cessation of these cruel persecutions"
 tendering "profound and earnest sympathy to those lovers of freedom who are struggling for home rule and the great cause of local self-government in Ireland"
 opposing "all sumptuary laws, as an interference with the individual rights of the citizen"
 favoring legislation "abolishing the notorious sweating system, for abolishing contract convict labor, and for prohibiting the employment in factories of children under 15 years of age"
 calling for legislation "to protect the lives and limbs of railway employees and those of other hazardous transportation companies" and denouncing Republicans for blocking such legislation
 calling on the Government to "care for and improve the Mississippi River and other great waterways of the Republic, so as to secure for the interior States easy and cheap transportation to tide water"
 recognizing construction of the Nicaragua Canal as "of great importance to the United States"
 approving "all legitimate efforts to prevent the United States from being used as the dumping ground for the known criminals and professional paupers of Europe" and demanding "rigid enforcement of the laws against Chinese immigration and the importation of foreign workmen under contract" but condemning and denouncing "any and all attempts to restrict the immigration of the industrious and worthy of foreign lands"
 recommending "most liberal appropriations for the public schools" at the state level and opposing "State interference with parental rights and rights of conscience in the education of children"
 favoring "the maintenance of a navy strong enough for all purposes of national defense, to properly maintain the honor and dignity of this country abroad"
 renewing "the expression of appreciation of the patriotism of the soldiers and sailors of the Union in the war for its preservation" and favoring "just and liberal pensions for all disabled Union soldiers, their widows and dependents" but demanding impartial, honest, and industrious distribution of pensions and denouncing the Pension Office under Harrison as "incompetent, corrupt, disgraceful and dishonest"
 "view[ing] with alarm the tendency to a policy of irritation and bluster which is liable at any time to confront us with the alternatives of humiliation or war"
 approving the admission of the Territories of New Mexico and Arizona as states
 holding that the "officials appointed to administer the government of any Territory, together with the Districts of Columbia and Alaska, should be bona-fide residents of the Territory or district in which their duties are to be performed"

See also 
 Grover Cleveland 1892 presidential campaign
 History of the United States Democratic Party
 1892 United States presidential election
 List of Democratic National Conventions
 U.S. presidential nomination convention
 1892 Republican National Convention

References

Further reading 
 Nevins, Allan. Grover Cleveland: A Study in Courage (1932) online.
 Chester, Edward W A guide to political platforms (1977) pp 121–126 online

External links 
 Official proceedings of the National Democratic Convention, held in Chicago, Ill., June 21st, 22nd and 23rd, 1892 
 Official proceedings of the National Democratic Convention, held in Chicago, Ill., June 21st, 22nd and 23rd, 1892 
 Democratic Party Platform of 1892 at The American Presidency Project

1892 United States presidential election
1892 in Illinois
1890s in Chicago
Political conventions in Chicago
Democratic Party of Illinois
Political events in Illinois
Democratic National Conventions
1892 conferences
June 1892 events